Tărpiu may refer to several villages in Romania:

 Tărpiu, a village in Dumitra Commune, Bistrița-Năsăud County
 Tărpiu, a village in Jichișu de Jos Commune, Cluj County